Samurai Cop 2: Deadly Vengeance (also titled Revenge of the Samurai Cop) is a 2015 American action film directed and co-written by Gregory Hatanaka, a sequel to the 1991 cult film Samurai Cop. The film stars Mathew Karedas (who also produced) and Mark Frazer, reprising their original roles, with Bai Ling, Kayden Kross, Tommy Wiseau, Laurene Landon, Mel Novak, Lexi Belle, Joe Estevez, and Mindy Robinson, Gerald Okamura, Cranston Komuro, Joselito Rescober, and Melissa Moore also appear reprising their roles from the original film.

The film was produced independently, with the budget raised by Kickstarter and Indiegogo.

Plot
In 1991, after taking down the Katana crime organization, LAPD Detective Joe Marshall plans to settle down with his girlfriend Jennifer when she is suddenly murdered by a young boy at a park.

Twenty-five years later, Katana boss Fuj Fujiyama has successfully rebuilt his syndicate into a powerful multi-national organization, but is caught up in the midst of a gang war with the Shinjuku and Ginza clans. He informs his Vice President Doggé Sakamoto and subordinates that the war has awakened a long-missing Joe, and they must defeat him in order to secure the future of the clan.

Following the murder of a senator at the hands of Katana agent Hera and the Katana's massacre of the Shinjuku at a night club, Joe's old partner Detective Frank Washington is led to a secret compound 400 miles away from Los Angeles and reunited with Joe, who has lived in self-imposed exile since Jennifer's death. After dispatching a group of ninjas at the compound, Joe reluctantly agrees to again team up with Frank after being told that the case of his wife's murder will be reopened for his vengeance. After being reinstated as a detective, Joe proposes to set up a surveillance on the warring clans. At the same time, he develops a relationship with a brunette woman named Milena Roberts, who bears an uncanny resemblance to his late Jennifer.

During a surveillance mission, Joe enters a nightclub, where he is suddenly greeted by a blonde Milena before a shootout between the Katana and the Ginza forces. Soon after, Frank warns Joe that Milena is not who she says she is. The next day, Frank is suspended due to his failure to stop the war while Joe is informed that the case is now under the jurisdiction of FBI Agent Carter, who is actually the Ginza's new leader. Joe and Frank decide to work outside the law to take down all the clans at the secret hideout known as "The Complex". Joe storms through The Complex, encountering the Ginza clan before Carter is shot by Mola Ram, leader of the Yick Lung clan. Joe kills Fujiyama and his henchwomen, then defeats Doggé in a sword fight. Linton Kitano, the new leader of the Shinjuku clan, battles Joe and is swiftly taken down, but confesses to Joe that he was the one who murdered Jennifer 25 years before. Linton prepares to commit seppuku, but Milena intervenes, revealing that she is his sister and they used Joe to infiltrate the Katana and help the Shinjuku become the only clan in the country. A disillusioned Joe leaves The Complex and parts ways with Frank and Detective Higgins before Lauren Kimura, a former Katana henchwoman, proposes to join forces with him.

Cast

 Mathew Karedas as Joe Marshall
 Mark Frazer as Frank Washington
 Bai Ling as Doggé Sakamoto
 Kayden Kross as Milena Roberts/Jennifer
Janis Farley appears as Jennifer in archival footage
 Tommy Wiseau as Linton Kitano
 Cranston Komuro as Fuj Fujiyama
 Laurene Landon as Detective Higgins
 Mel Novak as Cutter
 Gerald Okamura as Okamura
 Melissa Moore as Peggy
 Lexi Belle as Hera
 Joe Estevez as Captain Robert Harmon
 Nicole Bailey as Tessa
 Mindy Robinson as Lauren Kimura
 Thomas J. Churchill as Roger Takahara
 Jimmy Williams as Carter
 Robbie Augspurger as Mola Ram
 Lisa London as Master Kitano
 Kristine DeBell as Bobbie
 Nicole D'Angelo as Anna
 Joselito Rescober as Alfonso Rafael Federico Sebastian
 Jesse Hlubik as Lior
 Matthew Mahaney as Zemko
 Kevin Gowen as Thakar
 Yuka Sano as Yoshiwara
 Noah Inatsugu as young Linton Kitano

Production
Robert Z'Dar, who played Yamashita in the first film, was to reprise his role in the sequel but died during production and his scenes were never shot. The film is dedicated in memory of him and the first film's creator, Amir Shervan.

The feature documentary Enter the Samurai, which chronicles the making of Samurai Cop 2, was released on July 22, 2016.

Following the release of the original Samurai Cop, lead actor Matthew Karedas (then called Matthew Hannon) was presumed dead by fans as there had been no communication from him. Fuelling these rumors, a member of the production team of Samurai Cop also called Matthew Hannon did in fact pass away.

However, the lead actor Matthew who by then changed his surname from Hannon to Karedas, was keeping an eye on the film "reading IMDB comments" and was urged by his daughter to reveal that he was not in fact dead, leading him to post a Youtube video. This posting of this video lead to Matthew regaining a massive amount of notoriety and the successful Kickstarter campaign which lead to Samurai Cop 2.

Reception
Felix Vasquez of Cinema-Crazed.com called it a "mixed bag", describing the performances as "either way over the top or wooden" and calling the narrative stretched. He concludes that the film "isn't perfect, but it's a definite guilty pleasure with some memorable moments".

Notes

References

External links
 
 

2015 films
2015 action films
2010s police films
American action films
American buddy cop films
American independent films
American sequel films
2010s English-language films
Fictional portrayals of the Los Angeles Police Department
Films set in 1991
Films set in 2016
Films set in Los Angeles
Films shot in Los Angeles
Indiegogo projects
Kickstarter-funded films
American martial arts films
Yakuza films
2010s buddy cop films
2015 independent films
Films directed by Gregory Hatanaka
2010s American films
2010s Japanese films